Karl Pekarna (7 July 1881 – 23 January 1946) was an Austrian footballer and a manager. He played in two matches for the Austria national football team from 1904 to 1908.

References

External links
 

1881 births
1946 deaths
Austrian footballers
Austria international footballers
Place of birth missing
Association footballers not categorized by position
Austrian football managers
Alemannia Aachen managers